Allied Hospital is located on Dr.Tusi Road in Faisalabad, Punjab, Pakistan. Allied Hospital serves as the teaching hospital of Faisalabad Medical University, Faisalabad (Punjab Medical college). This hospital also caters to patients from Sargodha, Jhang, Chiniot and Toba Tek Singh areas besides Faisalabad District.

HISTORY
Allied Hospital (1450 beds) was established in 1978. It was equipped with the state of art machinery and new technology for teaching as well as healing purpose with courtesy of JICA (The Japanese Government). The institute is recognized by General Medical Council, Britain and Irish Medical Council, Republic of Ireland. The Government of Punjab granted autonomy to this institution in 1998 and a Board of Governors was empowered to run the institution. In 2002, Government of Punjab revised the act. Emergency department has been setup at DHQ and Allied Hospital and 100% free medicines are provided to all patients for first 24 hours.

Location 
Allied Hospital Faisalabad is located on Jail Road adjacent to Faisalabad Medical University, near Sargodha Road.

Services 
General Medicine
General Surgery
Neurosurgery
Peadriatics
Cardiology/ CCU
Ear, Nose and Throat (ENT)
Ophthalmology/ Eye
Dermatology (Skin)
Obstetrics & Gynaecology
Cardiac Surgery
Pulmonology/ T.B. & Chest
Accident and Emergency Department
Labour Room
Trauma Center
Orthopaedic Ward
Oncology
Psychiatry
Radiotherapy
Anaesthesia/ Intensive Care Unit (ICU)
Plastic Surgery
Urology
Burn Center (State of art)
Private Rooms
Nephrology
Diabetic Center
COVID-19 ward
Mortuary and Postmortem

Allied Hospital Faisalabad contains a number of qualified doctors and teaching staff. It provides all facilities to its patients, has treatment available for many diseases, and a burn center. There is also an emergency ward open 24 hours.

Covid-19 ward
According to the Pakistan Medical Association (PMA) sources, the ease in lockdown by the authorities had led to an increase in the number of patients in Punjab, especially in Faisalabad in May 2020. So this hospital took required steps to deal with the changed situation.

See also 
 DHQ Hospital, Faisalabad 
 Shifa International Hospital, Faisalabad
 List of hospitals in Pakistan

References

External links 
Faisalabad&ei=888fTriNK4TwrQfgxKWJAg&sa=X&oi=local_result&ct=image&ved=0CAQQtgM&cid=0,0,17478343899611909342 Allied Hospital, Faisalabad on Google Maps

Hospitals in Punjab, Pakistan
Faisalabad
Teaching hospitals in Pakistan